Kamalabaria N.C. is a census town located in the Jorhat district, in the northeastern state of Assam, India.

References

Cities and towns in Jorhat district